Eucamerotus (meaning "well-chambered", in reference to the hollows of the vertebrae) was a genus of sauropod dinosaur from the Barremian-age Lower Cretaceous Wessex Formation (Wealden) of the Isle of Wight, England.

History and taxonomy
John Hulke erected the genus in 1872 for " R.2522", a neural arch found by William Fox near Brighstone Bay, but provided no species name. He considered the Ornithopsis hulkei lectotype referable to the genus. He later referred NMHUK R.2522 to Ornithopsis, synonymizing Eucamerotus with Seeley's name based on the discovery of additional vertebrae from the Isle of Wight.  Later authors treated Eucamerotus as a synonym of Pelorosaurus.

William T. Blows resurrected the genus in 1995 as a valid brachiosaurid, added the specific name and added the species epithet foxi, designating the various vertebrae that Hulke (1879, 1880) had referred to Ornithopsis  as paratypes, while referring additional vertebrae and partial skeleton MIWG-BP001 to it. This last point has not been generally accepted; unfortunately, this skeleton has never been officially described.

Naish and Martill (2001) suggested Eucamerotus was a dubious brachiosaurid, and did not find Blows' characters convincing. Upchurch et al. (2004) considered it to be a dubious sauropod. However, a more recent review of Wealden sauropods from England places Eucamerotus as a valid genus of Titanosauriformes incertae sedis.

Paleobiology
The vertebrae are around twenty centimetres long. If a brachiosaurid, Eucamerotus may have been around 15 m (49.2 ft) long, small for a sauropod.  As any kind of sauropod, it would have been a quadrupedal herbivore.

References

External links
Darren Naish on Wealden sauropod diversity
More on Wealden sauropods

Macronarians
Early Cretaceous dinosaurs of Europe
Fossil taxa described in 1872
Taxa named by John Hulke